Earlytown is an unincorporated community in Geneva County, Alabama, United States, located at the eastern terminus of State Route 54 on State Route 52.

References

Unincorporated communities in Geneva County, Alabama
Unincorporated communities in Alabama